International School Benghazi (ISB) is an international school in Benghazi, Libya, about  from the city centre. It serves ages 3–18 with a British curriculum, and it was the first GEMS Education school to be established in Libya after the 2011 Libyan Civil War.

In 2013 an American ISB teacher was fatally shot near the school grounds.

By 2014 the school was temporarily closed. It was scheduled to reopen on Sunday 12 October 2014.

References

External links

 International School Benghazi (Archive)
 School Facebook 

International schools in Libya
GEMS schools
Benghazi